Duan Zhixing (died 1200), also known by his temple name as the Emperor Xuanzong of Dali, was the 18th emperor of the Dali Kingdom between 1172 and 1200. Duan Zhixing's reign was marred by the power struggles within the influential Gao family, whose power had long eclipsed the ruling Duan family.

Reign
In 1173, Duan sent a party of 23 envoys, led by Li Guanyinde (李觀音得), to trade with the Song dynasty in Hengshan Fort (橫山砦; in present-day Nanning, Guangxi). Li later removed Gao Shouchang (高壽昌), the Duke of Zhong (中國公), from power and replaced him with Gao Zhenming (高貞明; Gao Shouchang's nephew).

Aji (阿機) rebelled and ousted Gao Zhenming, restoring Gao Shouchang back in his duke position. Gao Zhenming then occupied Heqing (鶴慶) and proclaimed himself the Duke of Ming (明國公) and gave himself a temple name, effectively declaring independence from the Kingdom of Dali. Another member of the Gao clan, Gao Miaoyin (高妙音), also rebelled in Baiya (白崖) and occupied Shanchan (鄯闡).

He made a pact with his nephews, Gao Chengxian (高成賢) and Gao Chengzheng (高成正), to prevent them from taking over Shanchan. However, Gao's nephews betrayed him later and started a war with their uncle. It is unknown if these developments had any long term consequences.

Duan initiated several construction projects in Dali. Being a devout Buddhist like his predecessors, he repaired 16 Buddhist temples in 1190. In 1195, he ordered the building of defensive infrastructure at crucial entry points into Dali. Five years later, he died and was succeeded by his son, Duan Zhilian (段智廉).

Era names
Duan Zhixing had five era names in the twenty-eight years of his reign.
Lizhen (利貞; 1172–1175)
Shengde (盛德; 1176–1180)
Jiahui (嘉會; 1181–1184)
Yuanheng (元亨; 1185–1196?)
Anding (安定; 1197–1200)

In fiction 

Duan Zhixing is fictionalised as a character in the wuxia novels The Legend of the Condor Heroes and The Return of the Condor Heroes by Jin Yong. In the novels, Duan Zhixing was the ruler of Dali and one of the Five Greats, the five most powerful martial artists in the jianghu (martial artists' community) of his time, alongside Wang Chongyang, Huang Yaoshi, Ouyang Feng and Hong Qigong. His nickname is "Southern Emperor" and his signature skill is the Yiyang Finger, which allows him to project streams of energy from his fingers. He also learnt the First Heaven Skill, an inner energy skill, from Wang Chongyang in exchange for teaching the latter the Yiyang Finger. He is the descendant of Duan Yu, a protagonist in Demi-God and Semi-Devils. 

By the time of the events of the first novel, Duan Zhixing has abdicated and become a Buddhist monk under the name "Reverend Yideng". He makes his first appearance when the protagonist Guo Jing and his love interest Huang Rong seek help from him after Huang Rong is critically wounded, and he uses his skills to heal Huang Rong of her internal injuries. Towards the end of the novel, he shows up again to help Guo Jing and Huang Rong deal with a minor villain, Qiu Qianren, whom he saves from death and accepts as an apprentice.

Yideng makes brief appearances in the second novel. By then, Dali has been conquered by the Mongol Empire, which is also at war with the Song Empire. Yideng appears in Passionless Valley to help the protagonists Yang Guo and Xiaolongnü deal with the villains Gongsun Zhi and Qiu Qianchi, and briefly participates in the Battle of Xiangyang against the Mongols. At the end of the novel, he retains his position as one of the Five Greats in the jianghu but his nickname changes to "Southern Monk" to reflect his new status.

Notes

References
 Yang Zhen and Hu Wei, Zengding Nanzhao Yeshi vol. 1 (『増訂南詔野史』（明・楊愼輯，清・胡蔚訂正）)

1200 deaths
Dali emperors
Year of birth unknown
12th-century Chinese monarchs